Uppsalatidningen is a politically independent free newspaper in Uppsala, Sweden, which is published by Direct Press. The magazine was first published January 16, 2005 and is distributed to all households in Uppsala. In many public places in Uppsala and its surroundings it can also be found in magazine racks.  The paper monitors the municipality including society, culture, sports and entertainment from a local perspective. Circulation is 100,000 copies, of which 80,800 are sent directly to house holds every Friday, 18,900 copies are distributed via news stands and 300 copies are delivered addressed.

Public debate and opinion 

The paper participates actively in the public debate and information regarding the Uppsala area. The paper has for several years monitored the state of opinion such as municipal elections in 2006 and 2010.

References

External links
Official webpage of Uppsalatidningen

Weekly newspapers published in Sweden
Mass media in Uppsala
2005 establishments in Sweden
Publications established in 2005